The Cadillac Urban Luxury Concept (ULC) is a gasoline-electric hybrid, 4-seater, city concept car from Cadillac unveiled at the 2010 Los Angeles Auto Show. The vehicle features touchpad screens and projected displays that take the place of traditional gauges.

Overview
The ULC is designed for a turbocharged 1.0-liter, three-cylinder engine with a dual-clutch transmission and a hybrid propulsion system that employs electric assist technology, engine start-stop function, brake energy regeneration. The Urban Luxury Concept seats four adults, with access through a pair of scissor doors that extend outward and rotate forward when opened allowing easy access to all four seats. The Cadillac Urban Luxury Concept is a 3-door, 4-seater hatchback (sometimes referred to 2-door hatchback in the U.S.)

Gallery

See also
BMW Mega City Vehicle
CityCar
General Motors EN-V
Hybrid electric vehicle
Personal Urban Mobility and Accessibility

References

Urban Luxury Concept
Front-wheel-drive vehicles
Hybrid electric cars
Partial zero-emissions vehicles
Electric city cars
City cars
Hatchbacks